Gowrand (also Romanized as Gowrānd and Goorand; also known as Gerand and Kūrānd) is a village in Dizmar-e Markazi Rural District, Kharvana District, Varzaqan County, East Azerbaijan Province, Iran. At the 2006 census, its population was 137, in 37 families.

References 

Towns and villages in Varzaqan County